Josia interrupta is a moth of the  family Notodontidae. It is found in from the Cordillera Central of Colombia. There is one record from Panama.

External links
Species page at Tree of Life project

Notodontidae of South America
Moths described in 1901